Asfestan (also Romanized as Asfestān) is a village in Aghmiyun Rural District, in the Central District of Sarab County, East Azerbaijan Province, Iran. At the 2006 census, its population was 1,228, in 289 families.

References 

Populated places in Sarab County